Charles Owen Perry (October 18, 1929, Helena, Montana, US – February 8, 2011, Norwalk, Connecticut, US) was an American sculptor particularly known for his large-scale public sculptures.

Life
He served in the U.S. Army, during the Korean War, receiving a Bronze Star.

Perry initially studied architecture at Yale University, graduating in 1958. He then joined the firm of Skidmore, Owings and Merrill in San Francisco, where he continued to work as an architect until 1963. At the same time, Perry started developing some of his own ideas in sculpture and in 1964 staged his first one-man show of sculptural models in San Francisco, which led to some early commissions for his sculptures.

In the same year Perry won the Rome Prize (for architecture) from the American Academy in Rome and left for two years of study in Rome, Italy — an experience that confirmed his switch to sculpture. On returning to the United States, Perry began to concentrate on designing public sculptures, with Continuum outside the National Air and Space Museum, Washington, D.C., being his most prominent work.

In his later years, Perry diversified into developing chair designs, jewelry, and a number of sculptural puzzles for the Museum of Modern Art and the Smithsonian Institution.

Family
In 1962, he married Sheila Henry de Perry; they had five children. He also has a brother, Alexander Perry and sisters Carroll and Avery.

References

External links
Perry's web site
Charles Perry's autobiography summary
Mathworld: Dodecahedron
Stackable Perry Chair at KI

1929 births
2011 deaths
20th-century American sculptors
Modern sculptors
People from Helena, Montana
Artists from Montana
American military personnel of the Korean War
21st-century American sculptors